Aimee Elizabeth Mann (born September 8, 1960) is an American singer-songwriter. Over the course of four decades, she has released more than a dozen albums as a solo artist and with other musicians. Her work with the producer Jon Brion in the 1990s was influential on American alternative rock, and she is noted for her sardonic and literate lyrics about dark subjects.

Mann was born in Richmond, Virginia, and studied at Berklee College of Music in Boston, Massachusetts. In the 1980s, after playing with the Young Snakes and Ministry, she co-founded the new wave band 'Til Tuesday and wrote their top-ten single "Voices Carry" (1985). 'Til Tuesday released three albums and disbanded in 1990 when Mann left to pursue a solo career.

Mann released her first solo album, Whatever, in 1993, followed by I'm With Stupid in 1995. They received positive reviews but low sales, and placed Mann in conflict with her record company, Geffen. Mann achieved wider recognition for her contributions to the soundtrack for the Paul Thomas Anderson film Magnolia (1999), earning nominations for the Academy Award for Best Original Song and the Grammy Award for Best Female Pop Vocal. After Geffen refused to release her third album, Bachelor No. 2, Mann self-released it under her own label, SuperEgo Records, in 2000. It received strong sales and critical acclaim, establishing Mann as a career artist who could work outside the major label system.

Mann has released seven solo albums since. In 2014, she released an album with Ted Leo as the Both. She has appeared in films and television series including The Big Lebowski, Steven Universe, The West Wing and Portlandia. Her awards include two Grammy Awards, including Best Folk Album for Mental Illness (2017), and she was named one of the ten greatest living songwriters by NPR in 2006.

Early life

Mann was born in Richmond, Virginia, at the Medical College of Virginia on September 8, 1960. When she was three, her mother had an affair and became pregnant and her parents divorced. Mann was kidnapped by her mother and her new boyfriend and taken to Europe, where they traveled. Mann's father, a marketing executive, hired a private detective, who brought her back from England a year later to a new stepmother and two stepbrothers. Mann said her father was "like a stranger" when they were reunited, and she did not see her mother again until she was 14. She said the episode gave her post-traumatic stress disorder and anxiety around travelling later in life. She forgave her mother decades later, saying she had been "trapped on every side".

Mann grew up in Bon Air, Virginia, and attended Midlothian High School in Chesterfield County. Her drama teacher recalled her as "kind of an insecure kid, very quiet, very introspective … When she did start talking, she was worth listening to." When she was 12, Mann told her family she wanted to learn to play the bass guitar. Her family ridiculed her, saying it was unladylike, and she did not take up the bass until later: "When I grew up, I was in charge of my own life. I became serious about music. I finally learned how to play bass. What they thought didn't matter." She learned to play her brother's guitar when she was confined to bed with glandular fever at the age of 12.

As a teenager, Mann enjoyed David Bowie and Iggy Pop, and found punk and new wave music inspiring. She said: "[It] was so interesting, so inventive – literally do whatever you want. That Patti Smith was out there and people were accepting her? Oh my God, there's a way out." Feeling she did not fit in the "normal world", Mann enrolled in Berklee College of Music in Boston, Massachusetts, in 1978, and studied bass guitar. After 18 months, she dropped out and joined the Boston punk band the Young Snakes on bass. She was unhappy in the band, saying the other members objected to her writing love songs or music they considered too melodic. She joined the band Ministry, which she said helped her learn to write songs efficiently. In the early 1980s, she worked at Newbury Comics in Massachusetts.

Career

1980s: 'Til Tuesday

At Berklee, Mann met the musician Michael Hausman and formed the new wave band 'Til Tuesday, with Mann providing bass and vocals. They released Voices Carry, their debut album, in 1985. The single "Voices Carry" reached number eight on the Billboard Hot 100 and won that year's MTV Video Music Award for Best New Artist. According to Mann, "Voices Carry" was one of the first songs she wrote. Stereogum described it as "an early indicator of Mann's penchant for character study, drawing outside the lines of boy-meets-girl love songs". The success made Mann an early female MTV star; the Washington Post described her as "a neo-punk pop princess, a new wave glamour girl, all doe eyes, gangly limbs and spiky bleached hair with that long, braided tail snaking out from underneath".

'Til Tuesday released Welcome Home, their second album, the following year. Mann sang vocals with Geddy Lee on the 1987 single "Time Stand Still" by Rush, and appeared in the music video. 'Til Tuesday released their third and final album, Everything's Different Now, in 1988. According to Stereogum, though it "showcased a tremendous development in Mann's songwriting palette", the album was "dead on arrival". Mann said it was "scuttled" by a change of staff at their record company, Epic Records.

'Til Tuesday broke up in 1990 when Mann left to start her solo career. Hausman, Mann's former boyfriend, became her manager. She said later: "['Til Tuesday] were sort of doing, like, post-new-wave dance-pop stuff ... I started to feel like it was not really my thing. Acoustic guitar music was what I was more influenced by and what came naturally to me." Epic did not release Mann from her record contract for another three years, which prevented her from releasing new material. It was the first of several disputes Mann had with record labels, which Hausman said had a lasting effect on her attitude to the music industry.

1990–1999: Solo beginnings, Whatever and I'm with Stupid 
Mann developed her first solo albums with the producer Jon Brion, who had been a member of the 'Til Tuesday touring band. Mann found working with Brion exciting, and said that her songwriting improved with him. Together, they developed a sound that the Stereogum writer Doug Bleggi called "LA alternative". Mann's debut solo album, Whatever, was released in 1993 on the independent label Imago. In 1994, Mann moved to Los Angeles. She also toured as part of the British band Squeeze, playing her own songs and songs by Squeeze.

After Mann finished her second album, I'm with Stupid, Imago encountered financial problems and delayed its release. Imago eventually sold it to Geffen, which signed Mann in 1994 and released I'm with Stupid in 1995. According to Pitchfork, Mann's first two solo albums showed that she was "a witty, self-possessed songwriter", but they did not meet commercial expectations, with sales "in the low six figures". Mann began to be seen as "an 80s pop casualty" who was approaching "has-been status". Dick Wingate, the executive who signed 'Til Tuesday to Epic, described Mann as "the model of an artist who has been chewed up and spit out by the music business", and whose disappointment and bad luck had made her distrustful of record labels.

Later in the decade, Mann became a regular act at Largo, a Los Angeles nightclub that hosted performances from alternative songwriters including Brion, Elliott Smith, Fiona Apple and Rufus Wainwright. This shaped Mann's songwriting; Largo fit Mann so well that the owner jokingly nicknamed it "Aimee Mann's clubhouse". In 1997, Mann recorded a cover of "Nobody Does It Better", the theme song of the 1977 James Bond film The Spy Who Loved Me, for the album Shaken and Stirred: The David Arnold James Bond Project. She also made a cameo in the 1998 film The Big Lebowski as a German nihilist.

1999–2001: Magnolia, Bachelor No. 2 and label independence 
Mann received wider recognition after she contributed songs to the 1999 film Magnolia. Her music had inspired the film; the director, Paul Thomas Anderson, another Largo regular, said he "sat down to write an adaptation of Aimee Mann songs". The film features dialogue taken from Mann's lyrics and a sequence in which the cast sing her song "Wise Up". The song "Save Me" was nominated for a Grammy Award for Best Female Pop Vocal and an Academy Award for Best Original Song; Mann performed it at the 72nd Academy Awards. The Los Angeles Times described "Save Me" as Mann's masterpiece, which "solidified Mann's stature as an esteemed songwriter". Mann later said it "really gave a blood transfusion to my career. But it wasn't like I went from playing to five people to 5,000 people. It was just a real influx of energy." The Magnolia soundtrack album was certified gold.
Mann took more control over the production of her third album, Bachelor No. 2. Geffen refused to release it, feeling it contained no hit singles. In response, Mann sold homemade EPs of her new music on tour in 1999, which she described as a "DIY fuck-you-record-company-I'm-selling-it-myself move". She accepted an offer from Geffen to leave her contract, feeling she wanted to be "in charge of her own destiny".

In 1999, Mann and Hausman formed their own label, SuperEgo Records, and bought the Bachelor No. 2 masters from Geffen. Mann sold 25,000 copies via mail order from her website, a large amount for an independent artist. After she secured a distribution deal, Bachelor No. 2 sold 270,000 copies, outperforming I'm with Stupid. Pitchfork described this as a "decisive victory". Bachelor No. 2 became the 28th-best-reviewed album of the decade, according to the aggregation website Metacritic. The success established Mann as a career artist who could work outside of the major label system.

In 2000, Mann formed the Acoustic Vaudeville project, a mixture of music and comedy, with her husband, the songwriter Michael Penn. Among the comedians joining them were Janeane Garofalo, Patton Oswalt and David Cross. In 2001, Mann sued Universal Music over the release of a greatest-hits compilation, The Ultimate Collection, which she had not authorized and considered "substandard and misleading". She was also a judge at the inaugural Annual Independent Music Awards, an award for promoting independent musicians. She judged the awards again in 2011.

2002–2008: Lost in Space, The Forgotten Arm and @#%&*! Smilers 
Following Magnolia, Mann entered a period of depression and had a breakdown. She referenced the experience obliquely in her fourth album, Lost in Space, released in August 2002. In 2004, she released Live at St. Ann's Warehouse, a live album and DVD recorded at a series of shows in Brooklyn, New York City. She also appeared in the TV series Buffy the Vampire Slayer, performing "This Is How It Goes" and "Pavlov's Bell", and on The West Wing, performing a cover of James Taylor's "Shed a Little Light". Mann sang on "That's Me Trying" from William Shatner's 2004 album Has Been, cowritten and produced by Ben Folds.In May 2005, Mann released her fifth album, The Forgotten Arm, a concept album set in the 1970s about two lovers who meet at the Virginia State Fair and go on the run. The album artwork won a Grammy Award for Best Recording Package. In October 2006, Mann released One More Drifter in the Snow, a Christmas album featuring covers and new songs. Mann said she did not enjoy music that combines Christmas songs with modern genres, and instead drew inspiration from Christmas records by Bing Crosby, Frank Sinatra, Peggy Lee and the Vince Guaraldi Trio. In 2007, Mann contributed two original songs, "The Great Beyond" and "At the Edge of the World", to the soundtrack to the film Arctic Tale. She also contributed vocals to "Unforgiven" on John Doe's album A Year in the Wilderness.

In June 2008, Mann released her seventh album, @#%&*! Smilers. It features minimal electric guitar and an emphasis on keyboards. It debuted on the Billboard 200 at number 32 and on the Top Independent Albums chart at number 2. @#%&*! Smilers received mostly positive reviews, with AllMusic writing that it "pops with color, something that gives it an immediacy that's rare for an artist known for songs that subtly worm their way into the subconscious ... Smilers grabs a listener, never making him or her work at learning the record, as there are both big pop hooks and a rich sonic sheen." The music video for "31 Today", directed by Bobcat Goldthwait, features the comedian Morgan Murphy. The artwork, by Gary Taxali, was nominated for the Grammy Award for Best Recording Package.

2010s: Charmer, Mental Illness and the Both
In May 2011, Mann performed for President Barack Obama and Michelle Obama at a poetry seminar at the White House. She also appeared in a sketch for the Independent Film Channel series Portlandia; she played herself working as a cleaning woman, telling Fred Armisen and Carrie Brownstein that she needs the second job to support herself.

In 2012, Mann released her eighth solo album, Charmer, comprising songs based on the theme that personal charm is not always to be trusted; one song, "Crazytown", is about an alcoholic "manic pixie dream girl". Two singles were released: "Charmer", with a music video directed by Tom Scharpling, and "Labrador", which features the actor Jon Hamm and references to Mann's music videos with 'Til Tuesday. In the same year, Mann contributed vocals to Steve Vai's album The Story of Light on "No More Amsterdam" and recorded the song "Two Horses" for the soundtrack of the film Tim and Eric's Billion Dollar Movie.In February 2013, Mann and Ted Leo formed a duo, the Both, and performed shows in Los Angeles and San Francisco. They released an album in April 2014. In 2013, Mann appeared on the Ivan & Alyosha album All the Times We Had. On July 22, she filed a lawsuit against MediaNet, saying they were distributing 120 of her songs on an expired license agreement. She attempted to claim as much as $18 million in statutory damages. Mann settled out of court in 2015.

In February 2014, Mann appeared in an episode of the animated series Steven Universe as the voice of the Gem fusion Opal. She reprised her role for Steven Universe: The Movie (2019); with Leo, she performed the song "Independent Together". Mann contributed a version of Styx's "Come Sail Away" to the 2014 Community episode "Geothermal Escapism". In 2015, Mann and Leo appeared on Conan performing a song in support of the 2016 US presidential candidate Lincoln Chafee. Mann covered the Carpenters' 1973 single "Yesterday Once More" for a 2016 episode of the HBO drama Vinyl. In October 2016, Mann released a new song, "Can't You Tell", as part of the 30 Days 30 Songs campaign protesting the presidential campaign of Donald Trump.

In March 2017, Mann released her ninth solo album, Mental Illness, featuring collaborations with the songwriters Jonathan Coulton and John Roderick. It won the Grammy Award for Best Folk Album at the 60th Annual Grammy Awards. Coulton joined Mann for some performances on the Mental Illness tour. That September, Mann contributed the song "Everybody Bleeds" to an episode of the Netflix series Big Mouth. In January 2018, Mann appeared in an episode of the FX series The Assassination of Gianni Versace: American Crime Story as a bar singer, performing the 1984 Cars song "Drive". She also appeared in the sitcom Corporate in the episode "The Pain of Being Alive". In 2019, Mann released an expanded 20th-anniversary reissue of Bachelor No. 2 for Record Store Day. She also hosted a podcast with Leo, The Art of Process, interviewing celebrities including Wyatt Cenac and Rebecca Sugar.

2020s: Queens of the Summer Hotel and art

In 2020, Mann wrote a song, "Big Deal", for the animated series Central Park, performed by Stanley Tucci. On November 5, 2021, Mann released her tenth album, Queens of the Summer Hotel. It features songs inspired by Girl, Interrupted, the 1993 memoir by Susanna Kaysen about her time in a psychiatric hospital. Mann developed the songs for a musical based on the memoir with the producers Barbara Broccoli and Frederick Zollo, which was canceled by the COVID-19 pandemic.

In January 2022, Mann began posting autobiographical comics on Instagram. She said that making comics was similar to songwriting: "Having a short amount of time to make a point or to tell a little story ... It's by necessity very truncated." In 2023, Mann mentioned plans to create a graphic memoir. She contrasted cartooning with the communal activity of performing and recording music, describing it as a" weird, lonely, insular drive-yourself-crazy activity".

In April 2022, Mann displayed a series of her paintings, You Could Have Been a Roosevelt, at City Winery, Manhattan. The paintings are portraits of the "ten worst US presidents" and a selection of first ladies. Mann created them after promising her friend, the politician Antony Blinken, a painting for his White House office. She said that Blinken "declined to have a portrait of Millard Fillmore on his wall, and I can't say I blame him".

Mann was scheduled to open for Steely Dan on their 2022 tour, but was dropped. She said she had heard that Steely Dan did not think a female singer-songwriter would suit their audience. Donald Fagen, the co-founder of Steely Dan, denied this and instead said that Mann was not "the best matchup in terms of musical style". He apologized, saying he respected Mann and did not realize any commitment had been made. Mann accepted the apology and said it was plausible that Fagen did not know she had been announced for the tour. She covered the Steely Dan song "Brooklyn (Owes the Charmer Under Me)" on tour that year, which Variety took to mean she had forgiven Fagen. 

On May 22, 2022, Mann led a lineup of women performers raising funds for the Magee Women's Institute at Novo, Los Angeles. In January 2023, she launched an Audible podcast, Straw into Gold, in which she interviewed artists about the connection between art and trauma.

Artistry 
Mann's first instrument was the bass guitar; she played bass in the Young Snakes, 'Til Tuesday and the Both. She generally plays acoustic guitar for her solo shows, finding it "more convenient", with her producer Paul Bryan on bass. On her first solo albums, Mann and Jon Brion created a sound the Stereogum writer Doug Bleggi called "LA alternative". The style was associated with turn-of-the-century alternative acts such as Fiona Apple, Elliott Smith, Rufus Wainwright and Eels, all of whom worked with Brion in the 1990s. In 2006, NPR named Mann one of the ten greatest living songwriters.

Mann is noted for her sharp and literate lyrics. Pitchfork wrote that Mann explores depressing themes while "transcending the self-pity so associated with lovesick laments", and excels at using specific imagery to carry general meanings. The Washington Post journalist Michael Cavna said that Mann often writes about "underdogs, misfits and lonely, lost outsiders". In the New York Times, Nate Chinen wrote that "the sugarcoated poison pill is a reliable device for Aimee Mann, a singer-songwriter given to ravaging implication and dispassionate affect".

Though Mann is known for writing songs about dark subjects, her songs are often also humorous; she said, "I'm sure I'm the only person who thinks any lines or any moments are funny, but that's usually because they're the most accurate and bleak ones." She said she liked combining sad music with humorous or sarcastic lyrics, as it created the sense of a narrator trying to hide their feelings; she felt this was sadder than simply stating the feelings directly.

The New York Times critic Ben Ratliff wrote of Mann's skill for "writing urbane pop songs, melodically rich and full of well-worn sayings fitted into spiky couplets". Mann said she admires precision in lyrics: "I like a rhyme that's perfect and interesting. Some songwriting is so vague. It makes me yell at the radio, 'Home and alone do not rhyme!' I've been sloppy in the past, but I'm getting better over time."

The journalist Jon Pareles described Mann as a "formalist of pop songwriting" whose "verses, choruses and bridges arrive in their proper places and melodies trace a measured, symmetrical rise and fall". Mann said songwriting was "an exercise in order... To attempt to describe something — to make connections, to put pieces together, to try to sum up complicated ideas in a three-and-a-half minute song — that's trying to put chaos in order for me." In the 1990s, Mann came under pressure from her record label at the time, Geffen, to write hit singles, which she found frustrating: ''I've sort of tried to do it. I'll keep it in mind. I'll think, 'Well, this is pretty catchy' or 'I've kept this simple enough lyrically so that any moron can understand it.' But any time I do that I get bored, and then I don't know how to finish the song.''

Influences 
Mann cited Leonard Cohen, Stephen Sondheim, Fiona Apple and Jimmy Webb as artists she admires, and said that Steely Dan was "the one band that I 100% love, with no reservations". She said Elton John was the artist who was most important to her at an early age: "His melody, the chords, his singing ... There was something in the DNA of his melodic structure that I picked up on later and was influenced by." Mann also said that American Songbook standards and ragtime had "resonance" for her.

Personal life
According to the Ministry frontman Al Jourgensen, he and Mann had a brief "dysfunctional" romance in Boston in the 1970s or 1980s, which he said inspired "Voices Carry". Mann dated the 'Til Tuesday drummer Michael Hausman; after they separated, they remained friends and Hausman became her manager. In 1993, while Mann was recording her first solo album, Whatever, she met the songwriter Michael Penn, the brother of the actors Sean Penn and Chris Penn.  They married in 1997 and live in Los Angeles.

The success of the Magnolia soundtrack caused Mann stress, as she felt pressure to capitalize on it and tour heavily. In 2002, she entered the Sierra Tucson rehab center with anxiety and depression, and PTSD triggered by her kidnapping as a child. She also experienced intrusive thoughts resulting from an accident when the car of a drunk driver flipped her tour bus. In 2008, Mann said she had attended Al-Anon, a support group for the families and friends of alcoholics, to deal with the exhaustion she felt from trying to help addicts she knew. In 2020, Mann developed a nervous system disorder that gave her tinnitus, migraines, nausea and dizziness and prevented her from listening to music for a year.  She believed the disorder was triggered by a combination of childhood trauma and the stress of the COVID-19 pandemic.

Discography

Whatever (1993)
I'm with Stupid (1995)
Bachelor No. 2 or, the Last Remains of the Dodo (2000)
Lost in Space (2002)
The Forgotten Arm (2005)
One More Drifter in the Snow (2006)
@#%&*! Smilers (2008)
Charmer (2012)
Mental Illness (2017)
Queens of the Summer Hotel (2021)

Awards and nominations
Grammy Awards

|-
|rowspan=3|2001
|Magnolia
|Best Compilation Soundtrack for Visual Media
|
|-
|rowspan=2|"Save Me"
|Best Song Written for Visual Media
|
|-
|Best Female Pop Vocal Performance
|
|-
|2006
|The Forgotten Arm
|Best Recording Package
|
|-
|2009
|Fucking Smilers
|Best Boxed or Special Limited Edition Package
|
|-
|2018
|Mental Illness
|Best Folk Album
|

Other awards
{| class=wikitable
|-
!Year!!Awards!!Work!!Category!!Result
|-
|1985
|American Video Awards
|"Voices Carry"
|Best Female Performance
|
|-
|rowspan=7|2000
|Academy Awards
|rowspan=7|"Save Me"
|Best Original Song
|
|-
|Golden Globe Awards
|Best Original Song
|
|-
|Las Vegas Film Critics Society Awards
|rowspan=3|Best Original Song 
|
|-
|Online Film & Television Association
|
|-
|Satellite Awards
|
|-
|rowspan=2|MTV Video Music Awards
|Best Video from a Film
|
|-
|Best Editing
|
|-
|2006
|PLUG Awards
|The Forgotten Arm
|Album Art/Packaging of the Year
|
|-
|2013
|rowspan=2|A2IM Libera Awards
|Charmer
|Creative Packaging Award
|
|-
|2018
|Mental Illness
|Best American Roots & Folk Album
|
|-
| rowspan=2|2022
| rowspan=2|Denmark GAFFA Awards
| Herself
| Best Foreign Solo Act
| 
| rowspan=2|
|-
| Queens of the Summer Hotel
| Best Foreign Album
|

References

External links

Official website

Aimee Mann's discography at Discogs
Aimee Mann at Rolling Stone
Aimee Mann Live Interview/Performance on KCMP (2005)
Aimee Mann Live Interview/Performance on KCMP (2008)
Aimee Mann at NPR Music

Aimee Mann's Off-The-Wall Christmas Concert on NPR.prg
Aimee Mann Live at St. Ann's Warehouse (Performs "The Moth")

 
'Til Tuesday members
20th-century American singers
20th-century American writers
20th-century American composers
Place of birth missing (living people)
20th-century American women writers
21st-century American singers
21st-century American writers
21st-century American composers
American rock bass guitarists
American rock songwriters
American women rock singers
American women singer-songwriters
American new wave musicians
Alternative rock singers
American alternative rock musicians
Berklee College of Music alumni
Women bass guitarists
Women new wave singers
Geffen Records artists
Grammy Award winners
Living people
Musicians from Boston
Musicians from Richmond, Virginia
Singer-songwriters from Virginia
The Both members
Guitarists from Virginia
Guitarists from Massachusetts
20th-century American women singers
20th-century American guitarists
21st-century American women singers
People from Bon Air, Virginia
Proper Records artists
20th-century women composers
21st-century women composers
20th-century American women guitarists
Singer-songwriters from Massachusetts
1960 births